Martin Haase (born 25 October 1962) is a German  linguistics professor at the University of Bamberg as well as a linguist, polyglot, and podcaster.

Education

After secondary school graduation from Helene-Lange-Gymnasium (Dortmund, 1982), Haase studied general linguistics, Romance languages and historical and comparative linguistics at the Universities of Toulouse and Cologne, writing his 1991 Ph.D. thesis on language contact and language change: Die Einflüsse des Gaskognischen und Französischen auf das Baskische ("The influences of Gascon (Occitan) and French on the Basque language").

After further study at the University of Hamburg in 1992, Haase worked as an assistant professor at the University of Osnabrück. In 1997 he earned his habilitation with a second thesis, Dialektdynamik in Mittelitalien: Sprachveränderungsprozesse im umbrischen Apenninenraum ("Dialectal dynamics in central Italy: Language evolution in the Umbrian Apennines"). He subsequently took professorships at the Albert Ludwig University of Freiburg, the Free University of Berlin and the Berlin Institute of Technology (Technische Universität Berlin).

In 2001 he became a professor at the University of Bremen. The following year he accepted the Chair in Romance Linguistics at the University of Bamberg, where he has taught ever since.

Volunteer activities
Haase is committed to open source and open content projects. He is a Wikipedia author who served as a member of Wikimedia Germany's advisory board (2005–2007); he did not stand for re-election. Living mainly in Berlin, he is a member of the Chaos Computer Club, having served since 2009 as its board representative to the experience exchange groups (Erfahrungsaustauschkreise). Since 2009 he has also been a member of the Pirate party; the party supports government transparency, a right to information privacy and an end to genetic patents and Internet censorship in Germany but has no seats in the Bundestag.

Esperanto movement

As an undergraduate student Haase learned the international planned language Esperanto. He was active in the Esperanto youth group Germana Esperanto-Junularo, acting in an amateur theatrical group called Kia koincido ("What a coincidence"), and serving as its national chair from 1988 to 1990. Today he is director of the German Esperanto Institute and an associate member of the International Academy of Sciences, San Marino, where the main working language is Esperanto.

Other linguistic interests
Haase is a polyglot; he speaks German, English, French, Italian, Spanish, Basque and Esperanto, as well as the Catalan and Occitan. He is also able to read Latin, Ancient Greek, Sanskrit, Gothic, Dutch, Romanian, Russian, Maltese, Swahili and Sāmoan, and to communicate using German Sign Language (Deutsche Gebärdensprache, DGS).

See also
 List of Wikipedia people

References

External links

 Haase's blog 
 This article incorporates information from equivalent articles in the Esperanto and German Wikipedias.

1962 births
Living people
German Esperantists
Linguists from Germany
Members of Chaos Computer Club
Pirate Party Germany politicians
Academic staff of the University of Bamberg
German Wikimedians
Wikipedia people